The 2020–21 Macedonian Football Cup was the 29th season of North Macedonia's football knockout competition. This edition did not have a defending champions due to the interruption of the previous edition due to the COVID-19 pandemic.

Competition calendar

Source:

First round
The draw was held on 15 September 2020. Matches were played on 22 and 23 September 2020.

|-
|colspan="3" style="background-color:#97DEFF" align=center|22 September 2020

|-
|colspan="3" style="background-color:#97DEFF" align=center|23 September 2020

|-
|colspan="3" style="background-color:#97DEFF" align=center|N/A

|}

Second round
The draw was held on 29 September 2020. The matches were played on 21 October 2020.

|-
|colspan="3" style="background-color:#97DEFF" align=center|21 October 2020

|}

Quarter-finals
The draw was held on 27 October 2020. The matches were played on 25 November 2020.

|-
|colspan="3" style="background-color:#97DEFF" align=center|25 November 2020

|}

Semi-finals
The draw was held on 16 March 2021. The matches were played on 6 and 7 April 2021.

Summary

|-
|colspan="3" style="background-color:#97DEFF" align=center|6 April 2021

|-
|colspan="3" style="background-color:#97DEFF" align=center|7 April 2021

|}

Matches

Final

Season statistics

Top scorers

See also 
 2020–21 Macedonian First Football League
 2020–21 Macedonian Second Football League

References

External links 
Football Federation of Macedonia 
MacedonianFootball.com 

North Macedonia
Cup
Macedonian Football Cup seasons